Mystic Lake is the second deepest lake in the Beartooth Mountains, the deepest being Deep Lake. It has the largest sandy beach in the Absaroka-Beartooth Wilderness. The Montana Power Company utilizes the power of this large lake and has a dam present.  Mystic Lake supports a rainbow trout fishery. Hiking the three-mile trail up to Mystic Lake provides views of West Rosebud Valley and a few other lakes.

Climate
Summers are warm with cool nights. Winters are cold and extremely snowy with heavy snowfall for most of the year, and are the second snowiest in the state of Montana after Cooke City.

According to the Köppen Climate Classification system, Mystic Lake has a subarctic climate, abbreviated "Dfc" on climate maps.

References

Lakes of Montana
Bodies of water of Stillwater County, Montana